This is a list of active and extinct volcanoes in Chad.

References

Notes 

Chad
 
Volcanoes